Big Brother: Celebrity Hijack was a special series of Celebrity Big Brother, a spin-off series of the British reality television programme Big Brother. It was broadcast on E4 from 3–28 January 2008. A number of closely associated programmes also aired on the same channel. Dermot O'Leary – who had hosted Big Brother's Little Brother since 2001 – was the main host of Celebrity Hijack, and it was his final series of Big Brother.

The series was announced on 8 October 2007 by Channel 4 and that it would be replacing Celebrity Big Brother in January 2008, due to the widely publicised racism controversy in Celebrity Big Brother 5. In 2009, Celebrity Big Brother returned to Channel 4 and no further series of Celebrity Hijack were produced.

The premise of the series saw one celebrity a day taking control, with the help of Big Brother; organising their own tasks, making their own rules and talking to the housemates in the Diary Room. They were in charge of a set of housemates, ranging in age from 18- to 21-years-old and all having a special talent.

The housemates competed to be the last to leave the house for a £50,000 prize.
The series ended on 28 January with John Loughton being voted as the winner.

Production

Eye Logo
The "eye" logo used for Big Brother 8 was adapted to include the star used in celebrity versions and a splatter of purple paint across it to signify that the eye itself had been "hijacked". The colour of the splat is the same purple used for the E4 logo. The logo was unveiled on 3 December 2007.

Sponsorship
The series was sponsored by Virgin Mobile, who took over from parent company Virgin Media, the sponsors of Big Brother 8.

Broadcasts
The majority of Big Brother: Celebrity Hijack was broadcast on E4, with the first hour of the launch show being broadcast on E4 and Channel 4. The live launch, eviction shows, finale and Big Brother's Little Brother were hosted by Dermot O'Leary – who had been the host of Little Brother since Big Brother 2 in 2001. In 2007, O'Leary announced his departure from Big Brother, and Celebrity Hijack would be his last. E4 broadcast live coverage from the house, as well as Big Brother's Big Mouth, which was hosted by Mathew Horne and James Corden, who were guest hosts during Big Brother 8 the previous summer. They would not return for any subsequent series of Big Brother or Celebrity Big Brother.

Housemates
The housemates for this series were a mixture of British 18- to 21-year-olds, all with a special talent.

Amy Jackson
Jacqueline Amy Jackson (born 1986, Leeds) is a conceptual artist who lived in Leeds where she attended Leeds Girls' High School. She holds an MFA in Fine Art from The Ruskin School of Drawing and Fine Art part of the University of Oxford. She won the Geoffrey Rhodes Prize for the highest first-year exam results, and is a multi-award-winning conceptual artist working with photography and installations – Amy doesn't paint as she finds it 'too messy'. Amy wanted to incorporate her experience in the Big Brother House into her artwork. She is an accomplished musician who plays the saxophone, piano, clarinet and trombone. During the Andy McNab task, both Amy and Anthony were taken away and interrogated. They were both given a code and whoever didn't tell the code to McNab won a £5,000 prize and immunity to that week's eviction. Jackson was favourite to win the series, but she finished third place on the final day, Day 26. Jackson eventually graduated with a first-class degree in a Fine Art from The University of Oxford. Since leaving university she founded a new website called Lost Found and Loved Again for likeminded artists and designers who create upcycled goods from vintage items and a Pop Up Supper Club called Everything But The Ham, an experiential dining company in London, which raises funds and awareness for crucial causes. Amy Jackson still works as an artist creating public art and participating in group and solo exhibitions. In recent years she studied Sustainable Finance at the Smith School of Enterprise and the Environment, University of Oxford and also works in responsible investment where she presents about issues surrounding climate change on radio shows and podcasts including Breaking Banks.

Anthony Ogogo

Anthony Osezua Ogogo (born 24 November 1988 in Lowestoft, Suffolk) is an international boxer who has captained Great Britain's team in the World European and Junior Olympic Tournaments. He won the Junior Olympics in 2004, picked up the Most Outstanding Boxer of the Tournament and was crowned World Under 17 Champion in 2005. He represented Great Britain in the Summer 2012 London Olympics and won a Bronze Medal. Training three times a day, Anthony's overall ambition is to become World Champion, but he would also love to become the first mixed-race James Bond. His boxing name is 'Beautiful Brown Suga'.
On Day 26, Anthony was evicted, despite being second favourite to win, he came fourth. In 2015 Anthony participated in Strictly Come Dancing. In 2019, Anthony Ogogo had to retire from boxing following a serious eye injury.

Calista Robertson
Calista Kazuko Robertson (born 27 March 1988 in London) is a classical musician and children's music teacher. She has been playing the violin since she was 3 years-old and can also play the piano. Her father Paul Robertson is one of the founding members of the Medici String Quartet. She is currently studying at King's College London, where she receives instrumental tuition via the Royal Academy of Music. Calista specialised in composition at The Royal Academy of Music's junior academy under David Knotts and was awarded full scholarships to attend Miguel Mera's Film Music course with Stile Antico in 2007, both at Dartington Summer School. Calista has written over 100 songs ranging from full orchestral to cheesy pop, including the newly famous (thanks to Harry Hill) 'Bongo Jam'. She also teaches piano to 7- to 9-year-olds, as well as privately teaching violin, singing and music theory. Calista was the sixth housemate to be evicted, and left the house on Day 23 in a double eviction. Calista also went to St Catherine's School in Bramley as her secondary school.

Emilia Arata
Carmen Emilia Arata (born 1989, Birmingham) is a professional circus performer. She and her brother Victor have performed in front of the likes of The Prince of Wales and The Princess Royal. They also took part in Graham Norton's BBC One talent show When Will I Be Famous? in 2007 where they went on to win. Emilia comes from seven generations of circus performers and has been in training since she was four years old, performing professionally for the first time when she was six. Emilia performs six nights a week at the Palazzo Variety Show in Berlin with her brother Victor. Their mother Carmen is a trainer on Sky One reality show Cirque de Celebrite. Emilia has a list of work-related injuries that include broken knee, shoulder, wrist, fingers, and several ribs. Throughout the series, Emilia was regularly booed by the crowds outside the house, however despite facing three eviction votes, she survived them all to make a surprise appearance in the final. She speaks fluent Italian. Emilia was announced as the runner-up, on Day 26, with 46.1% of the votes. In 2015, Emilia and her other brother, Billy, appeared on Britain's Got Talent. In 2017, Emilia and Billy appeared on the 12th season of America's Got Talent.

Jade Eden
Jade Keiley Eden (born 28 November 1986) is a professional beauty queen. Jade has won numerous beauty pageant awards including Miss Essex 2006, Miss Winchester 2007 and came third in Miss England behind Naomi Smith who came second and Georgia Horsley. She is just back from competing in Miss Global City where she won the European section and was also awarded with Miss Sunshine Beauty 2007. She has been a member of Mensa since the age of four. Jade won a scholarship to a school for gifted children and recently graduated from The Urdang Academy in Covent Garden where she was also awarded a scholarship for Professional Musical Theatre. Jade is also an award-winning dancer. She competed internationally in Artistic Gymnastics and won 3rd prize for most expressive floor routine. She also featured in the music video for Blazin' Squad's single, "We Just Be Dreamin'". On Day 9, Jade was the first housemate to be evicted.

Recently, Jade appeared on the Walkers crisps Do Us a Flavour campaign as one of the dancers for its Onion Baji advertisement.

Jay Wilson
Jay Clive Wilson (born 13 April 1988 in London, England) is a fashion designer whose work has been showcased in both the New York and Caribbean fashion week. Jay has previously won the Tyler Media Award for young designers. He is stocked in some of the many design stores in Manhattan and describes his range as chic, classic and simplistic. Jay was the fifth housemate to be evicted, and left the house on Day 23 in a double eviction.

Jeremy Metcalfe

Jeremy Robert Metcalfe (born 9 April 1988 in Fleet, Hampshire) is a racing driver currently competing in the British Formula Renault Championship. The first time Jeremy got behind the wheel of a go-kart at the age of eight, he broke the track record on his first lap, and since then his life has revolved around karting and latterly racing driving. He won the British Cadet Kart Championship in 2000, in 2006 Jeremy was nominated for the McLaren Autosport BRDC Young Driver of the Year and in 2007 he was named as the BRDC Rising Star, classing him in the top six or so best young drivers in the UK. On Day 26 Jeremy was evicted, coming in fifth place.

John Loughton
John Loughton (born 1987 in Edinburgh) is a political campaigner. He is currently Chairperson of the Scottish Youth Parliament and hopes to run for senior office in 2009. On launch night, he was chosen by Matt Lucas, the hijacker at the time, to enter the house first and take part in a secret mission. His secret mission was to wear an ear piece through which Matt could speak to him and tell him what to do / say to each housemate as they entered the house. If he passed his mission he would win immunity from every eviction and a party for his fellow housemates. If he failed he would be up for every eviction. He passed and won himself a place in the final week. John was the winner of the series, taking 53.9% of the final vote.

In April 2008, he was appointed as a member of the Commission on Scottish Devolution. At the 2010 United Kingdom general election, John stood as the Lib Dem candidate in East Kilbride, Strathaven and Lesmahagow constituency.

Latoya Satnarine
Latoya Linette Satnarine (born 8 November 1987 in London) is a professional dancer who has appeared in over 20 music videos for artists including Madonna, and was also booked for a Mariah Carey concert tour. In 2007 she was nominated for the Best Female Dancer in the Dance Off Awards. Latoya has appeared dancing in over 20 music videos for artists including Madonna, Jamelia and Craig David amongst others. She says she is most proud of being booked as a concert dancer for Mariah Carey, as Carey doesn't usually use British dancers. On Day 21, in a surprise eviction Latoya became the fourth housemate to be evicted.

Liam Young
Liam Young (born 1 November 1988 in Widnes) was the registered director of a website services company called OxyUK Technologies Limited.  Liam claimed to be bisexual and was the second housemate to be evicted on Day 16, in a double eviction.

Nathan Fagan-Gayle

Nathan Abraham Fagan-Gayle (born 1986, London), also known by his stage name Starboy Nathan, is an R&B singer and songwriter. He released his first album, "Masterpiece" in 2006. In 2007 he was nominated for the Best R&B Act at the MOBO Awards and is an Urban Music Awards winner. Having achieved a top 40 hit, Nathan already has a critically acclaimed album under his belt, entitled Masterpiece. Nathan pens his own music and also counts rapping and music producing amongst his talents. Nathan had sung with Alicia Keys at the age of 15 years, and has interviewed her for his school. On Day 26 Nathan was evicted, coming in sixth place.

In 2012, he made it to judges' houses on the ninth series of The X Factor but Nicole Scherzinger chose not to take him through to the live finals.

Victor Arata
Vittorio "Victor" Arata (born April 1988, Birmingham) is a professional circus performer. He and his sister Emilia perform as a double-act at the Palazzo Variety Show in Berlin. Before entering the house the pair appeared on the talent show When Will I Be Famous? hosted by Graham Norton where they went on to win the £10,000 prize. The contortionist acts he performs with his sister are extreme and carry a high risk – Victor has broken an elbow (which now contains a metal screw), his knee and his fingers. Emilia and Victor's mother Carmen is a trainer on Sky One reality show Cirque de Celebrite.
He speaks fluent Italian. On Day 16 he became the third person to be evicted with 32% of the public vote. This was a double eviction. His sister, Emilia and close friend Jeremy survived the double eviction and both landed in the Top 5 in the finale, with his sister taking runner-up.

Celebrity Hijackers
The celebrity "hijackers" took on the role of Big Brother on one-day contracts.

 Jake and Dinos Chapman were reported to be hijackers but pulled out of the show.
Paula Abdul also agreed to hijack the house but had to pull out due to scheduling conflicts.
 There was no celebrity hijacker on the final day, day 26.

The House
Although much of the house was the same as the house used for Big Brother 8 there were some changes. The bedroom was painted green. The fridge was brought inside the house (during the main series the house had an "everything not where it should be" theme which saw the fridge in the garden). Many of the walls had pictures on of various things such as monkeys holding cameras and a shopping trolley on the door to the store room.
The pool was replaced with a hot tub due to the show being broadcast in January. The sofas were changed to be all purple, in keeping in the E4 theme of the house. There were also splatters of purple paint on the wall similar to those on the logo. The house was also given a new timber floor opposed to the pink carpet used for the main series. The bath was moved to the bathroom. The bedroom saw the biggest changes of all the rooms in the house. It was given a whole new set of furniture, with individual beds, instead of the four-person beds from the summer. The walls were painted green, some with wallpaper of skyscrapers. A gym (including exercise bicycles and a treadmill) was built, which could be entered from the bedroom. Two walls are orange, two are giant photos of mountains overlooking a lake. The hair dryers were removed and a bath was installed. The shower remained unchanged. The diary room chair remained the same except for the fact that the lights inside the chair were coloured purple to stay with the E4 theme. A hidden spiral staircase was used when Andy McNab hijacked the house to reach interrogation room 2. The spiral staircase was again used when Chris Moyles hijacked the house to reach a secret bar. It was accessed from a secret door inside the bedroom toilet. There was also another room that could be accessed from the storage room. It was used for tasks such as Janet Street-Porter's television task and Mathew Horne and James Corden's love room. As well, the vestibule that was used in the previous civilian series was removed, therefore the doors that originally led into the vestibule from the stairs now led into the main house.

Broadcasts
The launch of the show was broadcast on both Channel 4 and E4; subsequent shows including the final were only shown on E4. The live launch, evictions, and special episodes were hosted by Dermot O'Leary and introduced the first celebrity hijacker. Like the main series, live footage aired through the night.
Big Brother's Little Brother was hosted by Dermot O'Leary. It was shown Monday-Friday at 7.30 pm and Sundays at 7 pm. It was O'Leary's last series as he departed from the show to focus on his X Factor duties.
Big Brother's Big Mouth was hosted by James Corden and Mathew Horne. Big Mouth aired Monday-Thursday at 10 p.m. and Fridays at 10.30 pm. Corden and Horne were chosen as permanent hosts after being guest hosts during Big Brother 8.
Diary Room Uncut aired on Saturdays at 10 pm.
This year however there was no online live feed on Channel 4 or their sponsor Virgin Media's site. Also, as the series progressed the amount of live coverage on E4 was shortened.

Daily summary

Nominations table

Notes

Celebrity hijacker Matt Lucas set John a secret mission on Day 1. Wearing a hidden earpiece, John had to do and say everything that Matt instructed him to do without the housemates knowing he was on a secret task. Success meant a guaranteed place in the final, whilst failure meant automatic eviction every single time. John passed the task, guaranteeing himself a place in the final.
When Amy won a task on Day 10 she won immunity from this week's eviction. She also got to choose another housemate to be immune. She chose Anthony. Finally, due to losing the task against Amy, Anthony had to put one housemate up for eviction and he chose Victor. On Day 13, celebrity hijacker Joan Rivers selected Emilia, Jeremy and Liam to also face the public vote. It was a double eviction, meaning two housemates would be evicted.
The housemates nominated live. They each had two minutes to go to a private area and write down their two nominations. They were not obliged to give reasons for their nominations. They then all announced their nominations to each other at the dining table. Also, because of a double eviction planned that week, it was the three or more housemates with the most nominations that would go up rather than the normal two or more. Had there been no double eviction, Nathan and Jeremy would have been the only two up.
There were no nominations in the final week, instead the public voted for who they wanted to win the show. The housemate with the most votes would go on to win the show.

References

External links
  on Channel4

2008 British television seasons
Celebrity Hijack